Maria Egorovna Rykina, pen-named Mariyam Zhagorkyzy (Maria, daughter of Egor) (1887—1950), was an author and performer of Kazakh folk songs, and a People's Artist of the Kazakh SSR (1945).

Biography 
The daughter of Russian migrant Egor Rykin, Maria mastered the Kazakh language. She learned Kazakh folk songs well, and learned the national manner of their performance.

Her song "Dudarai" is a standby of modern Kazakh folk music, telling the story of a love that transcends national and religious boundaries. The name of the song comes from her pet name for the Kazakh man in question, Dudar, referring to his curly hair ( — Curly).

In 1920, the well-known collector of Kazakh musical folklore, musician-ethnographer Aleksandr Zatayevich recorded more than ten versions of the song "Dudarai".

Her story formed the basis of the opera Dudarai by Yevgeny Brusilovsky, first performed in 1953 at the Kazakh State Academic Opera and Ballet Theatre in Alma-Ata.

The Kazakh poet  dedicated the poem "Mariam Zhagorkyzy" (1950) in honor of the love story of Maria and Duisen.

References

External links 
 http://www.kaznai.kz/imgs/tokpanov_konferentsiya_sbornik_2015.pdf
 http://kitap.kz/index.php/catalog/book/2681-mariyam_zhagorqyzy_bekhozhin

1887 births
1950 deaths
Ethnic Kazakh singers
People's Artists of the USSR
Soviet women singers